"Beer Barrel Polka", also known as "The Barrel Polka", "Roll Out the Barrel", or "Rosamunde", is a 1927 polka composed by Czech musician Jaromír Vejvoda. Lyrics were added in 1934, subsequently gaining worldwide popularity during World War II as a drinking song.

History
In 1927, the music for the polka was composed by the Czech musician Jaromír Vejvoda.

Eduard Ingriš wrote the first arrangement of the piece, after Vejvoda came up with the melody and sought Ingriš's help in refining it. At that time, it was played without lyrics as "Modřanská polka" ("Polka of Modřany").

In 1934, the first text for the polka was written by Vašek Zeman – with the title "Škoda lásky"("Wasted Love").

The polka became famous around the world. In June 1939, "Beer Barrel Polka", as recorded by Will Glahé, was number one on the Hit Parade. This version was distributed by Shapiro Bernstein. Glahé's earlier 1934 recording sold many copies in its German version Rosamunde.

It is possible the reason for the rapid spread was due to the occupation of Czechoslovakia by Nazi Germany, and subsequent emigration of thousands of Czechs to other parts of the world, bringing this catchy tune with them.

The authors of the English lyrics were Lew Brown and Wladimir Timm. Meanwhile, the song was recorded and played by many others such as The Andrews Sisters in 1939, the Glenn Miller Orchestra, Benny Goodman, Bobby Vinton, Billie Holiday, and Joe Patek, who sold over a million copies of his album "Beer Barrel Polka".

During World War II, versions in many other languages were created and the song was popular among soldiers, regardless of their allegiances. On VE Day, 9 May 1945, Humphrey Lyttelton played it standing on a handcart outside Buckingham Palace, a performance that could be heard in the BBC broadcast from the victory celebrations.

It was claimed many times that the song was written in the country where it had just become a hit. Its actual composer was not widely known until after the war.

Names in other languages

Covers and homages

Music 
 Bobby Vinton recorded "Beer Barrel Polka" in 1975. The song was released as the follow up single to his multi-million selling "My Melody of Love" and reached number 33 on the Billboard, number 45 on the Cashbox Top 40 hit charts and number 51 in Australia. The success of the single, which was particularly popular on jukeboxes, led to its inclusion on Vinton's Heart of Hearts album in 1975.
 The song became a signature song of well-known entertainer Liberace.
 A parodic version in 1940 is used as despedida (closure) for Uruguayan murga performers Línea Maginot.
 Elton John was known to play this particular song at the Northwood Hills Pub, along with "King of the Road."
 Brave Combo and Jimmy Sturr & His Orchestra made their own compositions of "Beer Barrel Polka".
 The song is a standard for the accordion rock band Those Darn Accordions, who released a studio version in 1992 on their album Vongole Fisarmonica.
 The Wiggles sang this song on their 2005 album and video Sailing Around the World.
 John Serry Sr. arranged and recorded the polka for accordion and ensemble for RCA Thesaurus (1954).

Sports 
 Since the 1970s, it (usually the Frankie Yankovic version) has been played during the seventh inning stretch at Milwaukee Brewers baseball games, as well as becoming one of the state of Wisconsin's unofficial state songs as it is also played at numerous University of Wisconsin sporting events, as well as Green Bay Packers home games, and Milwaukee Bucks basketball games, including after every home win.
 The 2016 Premiership winning Australian National Rugby League club Cronulla-Sutherland Sharks use the tune of Beer Barrel Polka for their victory song Up Up Cronulla.
 At San Jose Giants home games, a batter from the opposing team is designated the "beer batter." If the San Jose pitcher strikes out that batter, beer is half price in the beer only lines for the 15 minutes immediately following the strike out. The beer batter promotion is in effect only for the first six innings of the game. The PA system plays Beer Barrel Polka whenever the beer batter comes to the plate and after every strike during the beer batter's at-bat (through the first six innings). After the sixth inning, the beer batter becomes the apple juice batter and if he strikes out, fans get half-priced Martinelli's apple juice.
 Pro wrestler Crusher Lisowski used the song as his entrance music, and would often growl out a few bars of it during interviews.
 The German football club Bayern München use the tune of Beer Barrel Polka for their song FC Bayern, lala lalala lala.
 The Italian football club Padova use the tune of Beer Barrel Polka for their goliardia song Dolce fiasco (Sweet flagon).

Plays and movies 
Arthur Miller's 1949 play Death of a Salesman features a recording of a young girl whistling this song.
 An instrumental version is featured in the 1941 film Meet John Doe.
 In the 1946 movie The Captive Heart, the song was sung by the POWs to drown out the camp speakers and by the repatriated troops as they arrive home.
 In 2005 the tune of "Beer Barrel Polka" became the main inspiration for the theme tune for Marvel Comics's The Fantastic Four movie and can be heard throughout.
 An instrumental version is featured in the 1985 Argentine film Esperando la carroza.
 Chico Marx of the Marx Brothers plays a variation of this song in the movie At the Circus and A Night in Casablanca.
 In the Disney movie The North Avenue Irregulars, a scene features a tape recorder playing The Andrews Sisters' version of the song while Patsy Kelly, Barbara Harris, and Virginia Capers sing along with it.
In Carl Davis's 1990 score for 1916 epic silent drama Intolerance, Davis incorporates the Beer Barrel Polka at the "Strike" scene at 17:33, despite the scene taking place in 1916, a decade before the song was written. It may have been meant to evoke a generic polka melody.
In the 2022 Dreamworks animated film, Puss in Boots: The Last Wish, Papa Bear of the "Three Bears Crime Family" gives another character, Mama Luna, the "piano treatment" which involves him playing her piano which she was thrown into while he sings a jaunty rendition of this song.

Television 
 It is sung in the final scene of the Rumpole of the Bailey television episode, "Rumpole and the Alternative Society" (1977).
 In an episode of Mr. Bean: The Animated Series, the Queen of the United Kingdom sings a portion of the song with a piano accompaniment.
 In an episode of The Critic, a trained bear plays the song for Jay Sherman, the critic, trying to stay a part of his show.
 It was played by Amanda McBroom as Eleanor Carlyle on piano at officers' club in M*A*S*H season 10 episode 1 ("That's Show Biz") after she says that "Even Dvorak and Brahms wrote folk dances" to Major Winchester.
 In the Hogan's Heroes season 1 episode "Papa Schultz - Top Hat, White Tie and Bomb Sights", Colonel Hogan convinces the Luftwaffe that he knows the details of the Norden Bombsight and has pro-Nazi leanings.  To firm up the subterfuge, Colonel Hogan describes a vacuum cleaner named "The Norden" in front of a wiretap with the prisoner crew singing "Beer Barrel Polka" loudly, interrupting lines of dialog.  Commandant Klink believes the performance because the various details not covered up by singing appear to describe a bombsight.
 In the Family Matters episode, "Chick-a-Boom", Steve Urkel creates a powder that explodes up when the song "Roll Out the Barrel" is played.
 In the Frasier episode, "Where Every Bloke Knows Your Name", Frasier Crane and his new friends sing "Roll Out the Barrel" in a British-style pub as a frustrated, and bewildered Daphne Moon looks on.

Comics 
 In the Girl Genius comic and webcomic, the titular inventor Agatha Heterodyne creates a fleet of defensive robots from carnival wagons and one from a barrel; that robot plays the polka while wielding a pair of axes.

Notes

External links

1939 singles

Polkas
Czech songs
Bobby Vinton songs
Milwaukee Brewers
Benny Goodman songs
1975 singles
Songs about alcohol
Works about beer
Songs of World War II
1927 songs
Songs with lyrics by Lew Brown